Thelma Day Drake (born November 20, 1949) is an American politician and former member of Congress for Virginia's 2nd congressional district. A Republican, she served in the U.S. House of Representatives from 2005 to 2009. Prior to serving in Congress, Thelma Drake served nine years in the Virginia House of Delegates.

After leaving Congress, Drake was appointed to be Director of the Virginia Department of Rail and Public Transportation by Governor Robert McDonnell, and later became Assistant Director of Public Works Transportation Division for the City of Norfolk. She also worked as a real estate agent in the Hampton Roads region. On February 15, 2018, Drake was nominated by President Donald Trump as the Administrator of the Federal Transit Administration. On January 3, 2019, the nomination expired. On January 16, 2019, she was renominated to the same office. The nomination expired on January 3, 2020 and she was not renominated.

Early life and education
Thelma Drake was born Thelma Mary Day in Elyria, Ohio to parents Harry Elwood Day and Ephram O'Brien Day. She attended both Elyria Catholic High School and Elyria High School. She later attended Old Dominion University in Norfolk, Virginia.

Career

Virginia House of Delegates
In 1995 Drake became the second Republican to be elected to represent the City of Norfolk in the Virginia House of Delegates since the Reconstruction era. She served in the House of Delegates for nine years representing the 87th District. Drake served as chair of the Virginia Housing Commission and as a member of the Chesapeake Bay Commission.

U.S. Congress
Drake was elected to the United States House of Representatives in 2004. She entered the race after incumbent Republican congressman Ed Schrock ended his re-election campaign. Drake defeated Democratic Party candidate, David Ashe, in the general election, becoming the third woman to represent Virginia in Congress after Leslie Byrne and Jo Ann Davis.

In 2006, Drake defeated Democratic Party candidate, Phillip Kellam, 51% to 49%.

In 2008, Drake was defeated by Democratic nominee Glenn Nye.

Personal life 
She is married to Ted Drake and lives in the East Ocean View area of Norfolk, Virginia.

References

External links

1949 births
20th-century American women politicians
20th-century American politicians
21st-century American women politicians
21st-century American politicians
Living people
Republican Party members of the Virginia House of Delegates
Female members of the United States House of Representatives
Old Dominion University alumni
People from Elyria, Ohio
Politicians from Norfolk, Virginia
Republican Party members of the United States House of Representatives from Virginia
Trump administration personnel
United Church of Christ members
United States Department of Transportation officials
Women state legislators in Virginia